Scrobipalpa arenaceariella is a moth in the family Gelechiidae. It was described by Powell and Povolný in 2001. It is found in North America, where it has been recorded from California.

The ground colour of the forewings are concolorous with a more pronounced indication of brownish lines in the longitudinal wing folds. Sometimes, there is a triad of dark brown stigmata in the cell. The hindwings are pale cinereous. Adults have been recorded on wing in early June and the species probably produces one generation per year.

The larvae feed on Artemisia douglasiana. Young larvae mine the leaves of their host plant, but later create characteristic shelters by forming a single fold of the leaf edge. They skeletonize the upper leaf surface within the tightly closed shelter.

References

Scrobipalpa
Moths described in 2001